The 1908–09 Football League season was Aston Villa's 21st season in the First Division, the top flight of English football at the time. The season fell in what was to be called Villa's golden era.

Players making their final appearance included Peter Kyle, Jack Windmill, Joseph Wilcox, Alfred Gittins, Rowland Codling, Len Skiller, Alec Logan, Jock McKenzie, George Reeves, Walter Kimberley, George Travers and Frank Cornan.

References

External links
Aston Villa official website

Aston Villa F.C. seasons
Aston Villa